Izh 2126, nicknamed "Oda" (Russian: Ода, for ode), is a compact hatchback produced by the Soviet automotive maker IZh (later Russian "OAO Izhmash", and eventually "IzhAuto") between 1990 and 2005.

History
The Oda was a practical replacement of the 1982 Izh 2125 Kombi and the last of Izhevsk-designed vehicles. A pick-up truck/panel van variant, known as Izh 2717, was also produced from 1991 to 2005. The first prototype appeared in 1977 but the production was delayed. 

Early prototypes, conceived in the late 1980s, implemented the base of Moskvitch Aleko, with notable borrowings in the body style, while the powertrain featured an upgraded 2125 Kombi engine and transmission. As planned, Izh Oda entered production in late 1991 alongside the Kombi. Like the Kombi, it was also planned for export release, which never occurred.

As the USSR collapsed, AZLK (which was more or less IZH's parent factory at the time) started losing revenue before being privatized, and IZH had to convert the production of about half its lines to other industries (such as firearms) in order to keep its automotive market running. As a result, only a faint number of about 5,000 Izh 2126 models were released between 1992 and 1995.

Starting 1996, IZH dropped the Moskvitch brand and merged with AutoVAZ, creating the "IzhAuto" company. The merger allowed to further upgrade the Oda with VAZ-derived features, such as Lada 110's interior design and front-wheel drive, all while implementing Samara's 2106 engine. The result was a boost in consumer demand, and in 1997, all of the previous Moskvitch-based models were discontinued, while the main line switched to production of both the 2126 and the 2717 only.

The best selling years of this model came between approximately 1998 and 2002, when foreign market wasn't made affordable to the average Russian consumer yet, and the economy car class hatchback brands (such as Lada Sputnik) did not offer much for basically the same price. The Oda also briefly sold in Kazakhstan, Ukraine and Belarus around 2003, which was a promising future for both IzhAuto's models.

However, in early 2005, Russian government overtook country's part in the European emission standards, for which other Russian car manufacturers redesigned their vehicles. IzhAuto, however, did not have enough funds to participate in the program, which obliged the company to discontinue all of its models, and couldn't upgrade its cars to meet new Russian gas emission standard's qualification. The last Oda models ran off the assembly line in September 2005.

Starting in 2008, parts of former Izh 2126/2717 production lines have been readapted for Lada Priora hatchback production. In 2014, most of the production plant has undergone major reconstruction to also accept the assembly of the hatchback variant of Lada Granta, as well as upcoming Lada XRAY and Lada Vesta starting 2016.

In 2001 the aging car, with its design dating back to 1977, was awarded zero stars out of a possible four by the Russian ARCAP safety assessment program.

Production
A total of 230.781 vehicle was produced at the Izh plant:
 Izh 2126 Oda (1990-2005): 141.510 units
 Izh 27171 pick-up (1995-2005): 3695 units
 Izh 2117 Kombi (1998-2005): 73.442 units
 Izh 21261 Fabula (2003-2005): 12.134 units

References

Moskvitch
AvtoVAZ
Compact cars
Soviet automobiles
2000s cars
Hatchbacks
Coupé utilities
ARCAP small family cars
Cars introduced in 1991
Cars of Russia